Fat Chance is the debut solo album by Paul Heaton, the former frontman of both The Housemartins and The Beautiful South, released in 2001 under the guise of Biscuit Boy (a.k.a. Crackerman).  The album was rereleased the following year, complete with new artwork and crediting the artist as Paul Heaton.

The album was critically acclaimed, but was not a commercial success.

Track listing 

 "10 Lessons In Love" - 4:59 (Scott Shields/Martin Slattery/Paul Heaton)
 "Mitch" - 3:53 (Paul Heaton/David Rotheray)
 "The Perfect Couple" - 3:54 (Heaton)
 "Last Day Blues" - 3:57 (Damon Butcher/Heaton)
 "Man's World" - 4:53 (Butcher/Heaton)
 "Barstool" - 4:07 (Shields/Slattery/Heaton)
 "Poems" - 3:47 (Shields/Slattery/Heaton)
 "If" - 3:56 (Shields/Slattery/Heaton)
 "The Real Blues" - 5:51 (Shields/Slattery/Heaton)
 "Proceed With Care" - 4:17 (Shields/Slattery/Heaton)
 "Man, Girl, Boy, Woman" - 2:28 (Heaton)

Personnel

Musicians
Backing Vocals – Lauraine Macintosh (3,8), Ricci P. Washington (3,8,9)
Brass – Andrew Ross (1,4,5,9), Dominic Glover (1,4,5,9), Nichol D. Thomson (1,4,5,9)
Drums, bass, backing vocals – Scott Shields
Guitar – Jimmy Hogarth (3,9)
Keyboards – Damon Butcher (4,11)
Keyboards, guitar, flute, backing vocals – Martin Slattery
Percussion – Ged Lynch (1,5), Pablo Cook (8,11)
Scratches  – Peter Barrow (7)
Strings – Ellen Blair (7), Jill Morley (7), Marsha Skins (7), Vicky Mathews (4,7)
Trumpet – Duncan Mcay (10)
Vocals – Beccy Byrne (6), Paul Heaton, Sharon Eusebe (3), Zoe Johnston (7)

Technical 
Producer – Martin Slattery, Scott Shields
Engineer, Programming, Producer – Richard Flack
Executive-Producer – Jon Kelly
Photography – Lawrence Watson
Illustration – Tracy Worrall
Design – Ryan Art

References

2002 debut albums
Mercury Records albums
Paul Heaton albums